Aethes alphitopa is a species of moth of the family Tortricidae. It is found in Venezuela and Colombia.

References

alphitopa
Moths described in 1968
Moths of South America